Nucula is a genus of very small saltwater clams. They are part of the family Nuculidae.

Fossil records
This genus is very ancient. Fossils are known from the Arenig to the Quaternary (age range: from 478.6 to 0.0 million years ago). Fossils are found in the marine strata all over the world.

Description
They are equivalve, symmetrical, approximately triangular. The surface has fine concentric growth lines. These clams live in the muddy sand close to the sediment surface at a depth of 20 to 200 meters.

Species
Nowadays there are still many species of this genus, which have had virtually no change in the course of time. Species within the genus Nucula include:

 Nucula annulata Hampson, 1971    
 Nucula atacellana Schenck, 1939 - cancellate nutclam   
 Nucula austrobenthalis Dell, 1990
 Nucula beachportensis Verco, 1907
 Nucula benguelana (A. H. Clarke, 1961)
 Nucula brasiliana Esteves, 1984
 Nucula calcicola Moore, 1977 - reef nutclam   
 Nucula callicredemna Dall, 1890
 Nucula cancellata Meek & Hayden, 1856    
 Nucula cardara Dall, 1916    
 Nucula carlottensis  Dall, 1897 - Charlotte nutclam   
 Nucula certisinus Finlay, 1930 
 Nucula chrysocome      
 Nucula consentanea Melvill & Standen, 1907
 Nucula covra Bergmans, 1978
 Nucula crassicostata E. A. Smith, 1872
 Nucula crassidens Nicklès, 1955
 Nucula crenulata A. Adams, 1856 - crenulate nutclam   
 Nucula crystallina Poppe, Tagaro & Stahlschmidt, 2015
 Nucula culebrensis E. A. Smith, 1885
 Nucula cymella Dall, 1886    
 Nucula darella Dall, 1916    
 Nucula declivis Hinds, 1843
 Nucula delphinodonta Mighels & C. B. Adams, 1842 - dolphintooth nutclam 
 Nucula distincta Turton, 1932
 Nucula donaciformis E. A. Smith, 1895
 Nucula dorsocrenata (Habe, 1977)
 Nucula dunedinensis Finlay, 1928   
 Nucula exigua G. B. Sowerby I, 1833 - iridescent nutclam, short nutclam   
 Nucula exodonta Prashad, 1932
 Nucula faba Xu, 1999
 Nucula falklandica Preston, 1912
 Nucula fernandensis Villarroel, 1971
 Nucula fernandinae Dall, 1927  
 Nucula gallinacea Finlay, 1930  
 Nucula granulosa Verrill, 1884    
 Nucula groenlandica Posselt, 1898 - Greenland nutclam   
 Nucula hanleyi   Winckworth, 1931
 Nucula hartvigiana Dohrn, 1864        
 Nucula hawaiensis Pilsbry, 1921
 Nucula inconspicua H. Adams, 1871
 Nucula insignis (Hayami & Kase, 1993)
 Nucula interflucta Marincovich, 1973
 Nucula iphigenia Dall, 1896
 Nucula irregularis G. B. Sowerby III, 1904
 Nucula izushotoensis (Okutani, 1966)
 Nucula kanaka Bergmans, 1991
 Nucula kerguelensis Thiele, 1912
 Nucula libera Bergmans, 1991
 Nucula malabarica Hanley, 1860
 Nucula mariae Nolf, 2005
 Nucula marmorea Hinds, 1843
 Nucula marshalli Schenck, 1939
 Nucula mayi (Iredale, 1930)
 Nucula mesembrina (Hedley, 1916)
 Nucula mitralis Hinds, 1843
 Nucula multidentata Prashad, 1933
 Nucula nicklesi Cosel, 1995
 Nucula nitidosa Winckworth, 1930  (unaccepted name: Nucula turgida Leckenby & Marshall, 1875)
 Nucula nitidula A. Adams, 1856 
 Nucula nitidulaformis Powell, 1971 
 Nucula notobenthalis Thiele, 1912
 Nucula nucleus (Linnaeus, 1758)    
 Nucula oppressa Bergmans, 1991
 Nucula papillifera Thiele & Jaeckel, 1931
 Nucula paulula A. Adams, 1856
 Nucula percrassa (Conrad, 1858 ) 
 Nucula pisum G. B. Sowerby I, 1833
 Nucula planiculmen Kilburn, 1999
 Nucula praetenta Iredale, 1924
 Nucula profundorum E. A. Smith, 1885
 Nucula proxima Say, 1822 - Atlantic nutclam   
 Nucula pseudoexigua Villarroel & Stuardo, 1998
 Nucula pusilla Angas, 1877
 Nucula recens Dell, 1956
 Nucula revei Bergmans, 1978
 Nucula rhytidopleura Kilburn, 1999
 Nucula rossiana Finlay, 1930 
 Nucula rugulosa G. B. Sowerby I, 1833
 Nucula saltator (Iredale, 1939)
 Nucula schencki Hertlein & Strong, 1940
 Nucula sculpturata G. B. Sowerby III, 1904
 Nucula semen Thiele & Jaeckel, 1931
 Nucula semiornata d'Orbigny, 1842
 Nucula sericea Thiele & Jaeckel, 1931
 Nucula striolata A. Adams, 1856
 Nucula suahelica (Thiele & Jaeckel, 1931)
 Nucula subluxa Kilburn, 1999
 Nucula subovata Verrill & Bush, 1898    
 Nucula sulcata Bronn, 1831    
 Nucula sultana Thiele & Jaeckel, 1931
 Nucula surinamensis Van Regteren Altena, 1968
 Nucula tamatavica Odhner, 1943
 Nucula tenuis (Montagu, 1808)
 Nucula tersior Marwick, 1929 †
 Nucula thielei Schenck, 1939
 Nucula tokyoensis Yokoyama, 1920
 Nucula torresi E. A. Smith, 1885
 Nucula trigonica Lan & Lee, 2001
 Nucula tumidula (Malm, 1860)    
 Nucula venezuelana Weisbord, 1964
 Nucula vincentiana (Cotton & Godfrey, 1938)
 Nucula zophos A. H. Clark, 1960

Extinct species
Extinct species within the genus Nucula include:

N. alcocki † Noetling 1895
N. andersoni † Clark & Durham 1946
N. assiniboiensis † Russell & Landes 1937
N. athabaskensis † McLearn 1931
N. brewsterensis † Hassan 1953
N. cancellata † Meek & Hayden 1857
N. cancellata † Vredenburg 1928
N. catalina † Olsson 1930
N. chrysocoma † Dall 1908
N. cilleborgensis † Ravn 1907
N. concinna † Sowerby 1836
N. cossmanni † Vincent 1892
N. costaeimbricatus † Newton 1922
N. crepida † Marwick 1931
N. cunifrons † Conrad 1860
N. domandaensis † Eames 1951
N. gabbiana † Dickerson 1916
N. greppina † Deshayes 1858
N. major † Richards 1944
N. mancorensis † Olsson 1931
N. martini † Finlay 1927
N. micheleae † Marincovich jr. 1993
N. morundiana † Tate 1886
N. narica † Vredenburg 1928
N. nejdensis † Abbass 1972
N. njalindugensis † Martin 1919
N. observatoria † Ihering 1907
N. orbicella † Olsson 1922
N. paboensis † Olsson 1931
N. paytensis † Adams 1856
N. piacentina †  Lamarck
N. pilkeyi † Ward & Blackwelder 1987
N. planimarginata † Meek & Hayden 1857
N. praemissa † Semper 1861
N. prunicola † Dall 1898
N. rembangensis † Martin 1919
N. reticularis † Ortmann 1900
N. sedanensis † Haanstra & Spiker 1932
N. semistriata † Tate 1886
N. shaleri † Dall 1894
N. sinaria † Dall 1898
N. stantoni † Stephenson 1923
N. studeri † d'Archiac 1850
N. subrotundata † Morningstar 1922
N. subtransversa † Nyst 1844
N. suprastriata † Arnold 1903
N. tallahalaensis † Dockery 1982
N. taphria † Dall 1898
N. tatriana † King 1850
N. tersior † Marwick 1929
N. tumida † Tenison Woods 1877
N. turgens † Wood 1879
N. venezuelana † Weisbord 1964
N. ventricosa † Hall 1868
N. vestigia † Marwick 1929
N. vicksburgensis † Conrad 1848
N. waikuraensis † Marwick 1931
N. washingtonensis † Weaver 1916

References

 Powell A. W. B., New Zealand Mollusca, William Collins Publishers Ltd, Auckland, New Zealand 1979 

Nuculidae
Extant Ordovician first appearances
Paleozoic life of Alberta
Paleozoic life of the Northwest Territories
Paleozoic life of Nova Scotia
Paleozoic life of Nunavut
Paleozoic life of Ontario
Paleozoic life of Quebec
Paleozoic life of Yukon
Bivalve genera
Taxa described in 1799
Taxa named by Jean-Baptiste Lamarck